Admiral Walter Maurice Ellerton CB (5 August 1870 – 27 November 1948) was a Royal Navy officer who went on to be Commander-in-Chief, East Indies Station.

Naval career
Educated at Sherborne, Ellerton joined the Royal Navy in 1884. He served in World War I and, as captain of HMS Cornwall, took part in the Battle of the Falkland Islands in December 1914. He was commended for his service in Gallipoli in 1915.

Promoted to rear admiral in 1921, he was appointed director of training and staff duties at the Admiralty that year, senior naval officer in Gibraltar in 1923 and Commander-in-Chief, East Indies Station in 1925. He was promoted to vice admiral on 4 October 1926, and retired with the rank of admiral in 1929.

Family
In 1909 he married Gwendolen Mary Kennard.

References

External links
 

1870 births
1948 deaths
People educated at Sherborne School
Royal Navy admirals
Companions of the Order of the Bath